Rikeya Horne (born 14 September 1999) is an Australian rugby league footballer who plays for the St George Illawarra Dragons in the NRL Women's Premiership and the St Marys Saints in the NSWRL Women's Premiership. 

Primarily a er, she is a Prime Minister's XIII representative.

Background
Born in Shellharbour, New South Wales, Horne played her junior rugby league for the Corrimal Cougars.

Playing career
On 27 August 2016, Horne played for the St George Illawarra Dragons in an exhibition nines game against the Cronulla-Sutherland Sharks. In 2017, Horne played for the Illawarra Steelers in the Tarsha Gale Cup, scoring six tries.

2018
In February, Horne was a member of Australia's 2018 Rugby League Commonwealth Championship gold medal-winning side. In June 2018, she represented NSW Country at the Women's National Championships. On 13 June, she signed with the Dragons' NRL Women's Premiership team.

In Round 1 of the 2018 NRL Women's season, Horne made her debut for the Dragons in their 4–30 loss to the Brisbane Broncos.

2019
In May, Horne represented NSW Country at the Women's National Championships.

2020
In 2020, Horne joined the Canterbury-Bankstown Bulldogs NSWRL Women's Premiership team.

References

External links
St George Illawarra Dragons profile

1999 births
Living people
Australian female rugby league players
Rugby league wingers
Rugby league fullbacks
Rugby league centres
St. George Illawarra Dragons (NRLW) players